The UK Dance Singles Chart and the UK Dance Albums Chart are music charts compiled in the United Kingdom by the Official Charts Company from sales of songs in the dance music genre (e.g. house, trance, drum and bass, garage, synthpop) in record stores and digital downloads. The chart can be viewed on the BBC Radio 1's and Official Charts Company's website. The archive on the Official Charts Company website goes back to 3 July 1994, the beginning of the first charting week. The dates listed in the menus below represent the Saturday after the Sunday the chart was announced, as per the way the dates are given in chart publications such as the ones produced by Billboard, Guinness, and Virgin.

Digital downloads became eligible on the Dance Singles and Albums Charts in June 2009. Prior to that, only vinyl and CD sales were compiled into the chart.

The Dance Singles and Albums Charts contain 40 positions.

See also
Lists of UK Dance Singles Chart number ones
Lists of UK Dance Albums Chart number ones

References

External links
UK Dance Albums Chart
UK Dance Singles Chart

British record charts
Electronic dance music